Avviare Educational Hub is a private college situated in Sector 62, Noida of Uttar Pradesh, India. This college is affiliated to Glocal University, Saharanpur, Uttar Pradesh offering various diploma, undergraduate and postgraduate courses.

References

External links 

Universities and colleges in Noida
Colleges in India
Educational institutions established in 2013
2013 establishments in Uttar Pradesh